Bronco is a former settlement in Nevada County, California,  from Truckee by the Southern Pacific Railroad.

History
The Bronco post office was open during the period of 1872 until 1891.

In 1933, an alternate spelling, Broncho, was rejected by the United States Board on Geographic Names.

References

Former settlements in Nevada County, California
Former populated places in California